Henry Molleston III (January 1, 1762November 11, 1819) was an American physician and politician from Dover, in Kent County, Delaware. He was a member of the Federalist Party, who served in the Delaware General Assembly, and was elected Governor of Delaware, but died before taking office.

Early life and family
Molleston was born in Mispillion Hundred, Kent County, Delaware, near Thompsonville. He was the son of Henry and Sarah Manlove Molleston. His ancestor, Alexander Mollestine, was probably Dutch, and was an early settler of Lewes, Delaware. His grandfather, Henry, was a member of the Colonial Assembly in 1687. Henry III was the brother of Jemima Ann, the wife of Colonel John Haslet, and uncle of Dr. William G. Molleston, surgeon in the Delaware Regiment and member of the State House. He married Mary (Molly) Combe in 1793 and they had three known children: Elizabeth, Jemima Ann, and a son. They were members of the Methodist Church.

Professional and political career 
Molleston was a physician, but was also a miller and was known to have had two mills on Isaac's Branch of the St. Jones River. He was also a Trustee of Union Academy in Camden. In 1800 it is believed he lived at "Passey" or "Cooper's Corner, where State Street crosses U.S. Highway 13.

Molleston was a member of the convention that wrote and approved the Delaware Constitution of 1792. In 1799 he was elected to the State House and served from the 1800 session through the 1808 session. After serving as state treasurer from 1808 until 1813, he was elected again to the State House for the 1814 session and then to the state senate, where he served from the 1815 session through the 1819 session. He was Speaker of the State Senate from the 1817 session through the 1819 session.

In 1819 he was elected Governor of Delaware by defeating Manaen Bull of Laurel, the Democratic-Republican candidate, but died shortly after the election and before taking office. His death precipitated something of a political crisis, as this situation was not anticipated in the constitution. The agreed-upon solution was for the newly elected State Senate to elect a Speaker, Jacob Stout, and for the incumbent governor, John Clark, to resign before the end of his term, so the newly elected Speaker could succeed to the office. It was also agreed that Stout would serve only one year as governor before a special election was held.

Death and legacy 
Molleston died at his home in Dover. His burial location is unknown, but possibilities include the property where his home was located, the old Whatcoat Cemetery at Camden, or the old Banning Chapel Cemetery on the Dover-Magnolia Road. No known portrait of Henry Molleston exists.

Almanac
Elections were held the first Tuesday of October. Members of the Delaware General Assembly took office the first Tuesday of January. State senators had a three-year term and state representatives had a one-year term. The governor took office the third Tuesday of January and had a three-year term.

Further reading
Delaware Historical Society; website; 505 North Market Street, Wilmington, Delaware 19801; (302) 655-7161
University of Delaware; Library website; 181 South College Avenue, Newark, Delaware 19717; (302) 831–2965

References

External links
Biographical Directory of the Governors of the United States
Delaware’s Governors
The Political Graveyard

|-

1762 births
1819 deaths
18th-century American physicians
Methodists from Delaware
Burials in Kent County, Delaware
Delaware Federalists
Delaware state senators
Elected officials who died without taking their seats
Federalist Party state governors of the United States
Governors of Delaware
Members of the Delaware House of Representatives
People from Dover, Delaware
People of colonial Delaware
Physicians from Delaware